H.K.Prakash is an Indian film producer and businessman best known for his Kannada films. He has produced successful Kannada films like RangiTaranga and Avane Srimannarayana under his production banner Shree Devi Entertainers.

Career
After succeeding in real estate business, Prakash entered Kannada Film Industry with the film RangiTaranga, which was directed by Anup Bhandari. RangiTaranga turned out to be one of the biggest blockbusters. It also opened overseas market for Kannada films in a big way. It became the first Kannada film to release in many countries, the first Kannada film to appear on the New York Box Office Listing and the first and only Kannada film to run for 50 days in USA. RangiTaranga was also one of the 305 films shortlisted for the Academy Awards (The Oscars) but did not make it to the final nominations. Since then Prakash has been into film production frequently.

Filmography

Awards

Notes

References

External links
 

Film producers from Bangalore
Living people
Kannada film producers
1971 births